Kānga waru is a type of pudding from New Zealand. The dessert is made from cornmeal made into a dough that's wrapped and steamed. The dessert originates from the Māori people and is closely associated with Māori cuisine.

Etymology
The Māori word 'Kānga' is a direct transliteration of the English word for Corn. 'Waru' is derived from the Polynesian word 'Waru' which means 'to scrape', one of the preparation methods used by Polynesians for the preparation of traditional puddings. Corn was introduced to New Zealand by early Europeans and was adopted by Māori as a food crop. Several dishes were made from corn such as Kānga pirau (fermented corn) and Kānga pungarehu (corn cooked in ash).

Preparation
Kānga waru is prepared from corn, either grated or cornmeal, with flour, sugar, butter, milk and grated kūmara (sweet potato) mixed together and formed into a dough. The dough is then wrapped and steamed for several minutes. Kānga waru is traditionally wrapped in corn husks and cooked in a hāngi, though modern day preparations use foil and is cooked in a similar way to steamed puddings.

See also

 Humitas
 Pamonha, a similar Brazilian corn dessert.
 Tamale

References

Māori cuisine
New Zealand desserts
Maize dishes